Drageid Chapel is a parish church of the Church of Norway in Høylandet municipality in Trøndelag county, Norway. It is located in the village of Vassbotna, in the southern part of the municipality. It is one of the churches for the Høylandet parish which is part of the Namdal prosti (deanery) in the Diocese of Nidaros. The brown, hexagonal church was built in 1976 using plans drawn up by the architect Arne Aursand. The church seats about 90 people.

The church has a free-standing steeple near the main entrance to the chapel.

See also
List of churches in Nidaros

References

Høylandet
Churches in Trøndelag
Hexagonal churches in Norway
Wooden churches in Norway
20th-century Church of Norway church buildings
Churches completed in 1976
1976 establishments in Norway